Colva ( कोलवा )

is a seaside village situated in Salcete subdistrict, South Goa district, Goa state on the west coast of India. Colva Beach spans about  along a sandy coastline of approximately  extending from Bogmalo in the north to Cabo de Rama in the south.

The village had significant importance to Portuguese and was the retreat for Goa's high society, who would come to Colva for their  (change of air). Today the Portuguese area is dotted with houses or villas, including many ruins. On weekends, huge crowds of tourists, visitors from around the world as well as local Indians, enjoy the sunset and various activities. The beach is particularly busy in October, when hordes of religious pilgrims come and visit Colva Church, called  (Church of Our Lady of Mercies), that was founded in AD 1630 by the Roiz family and rebuilt in the eighteenth century on the village square.

The local people have been fishermen since the mid-16th century. They include Hindu converts as well as migrants from various Portuguese overseas territories such as Angola, Mozambique, Brazil, etc. as well as Portugal itself.

History
Colvá was a vast barren uninhabited land with a scenic Arabian Sea beach that had beach plants such as scaevola sericea until a few Harim (fisherfolk community) settled there as migrants, primarily in the neighbouring village of Benaulim. The Mughal Empire, and the Adil Shahi dynasty preferred the north and hilly regions of Goa, where they built forts and defences, rather than the coastal belt, and hence had not settled the barren land of Colvá. It was the Portuguese conquest which established the western regions of South Goa as a full-fledged human settlement.

Colvá was under Portuguese administration, as the Province of Portuguese-Goa, from 1510 until 1961 (and was still under dispute and represented in the Parliament of Portugal till 1974/75). It was the village of the Portuguese Roiz family, the descendants of D. Diogo Rodrigues, and its villagers. The village had belonged since 1550 to D. Diogo Rodrigues, who was the Lord of Colvá (Landlord of Colvá). He built the first Portuguese architecture residential house in 1551 facing away from the sea and at a distance from the shore to avoid any enemy attacks from the Arabian Sea. The entire beach called  belonged to him.

In the 18th century, one of Diogo's descendants, Sebastião José Roiz, ordered the village people to plant coconut trees along the entire coastline, which the villagers thought was a waste of time as the soil was white and thus infertile and unable to sustain their growth. However today the shore line is fringed by those plantations of coconut trees. The entire Colvá shore and beach property as far as Betalbatim was inherited by various descendants of the Roiz family until the late 20th century, after which parts were handed over to the Government of Goa under the post-1974 Indian administration following the 1961 annexation of Goa by India. The rest of the land was sold.

According to local legend, the statue at Our Lady of Mercy church was found in the mid-seventeenth century along the coast of Mozambique after Rev Fr. Bento Ferreira and his party had been shipwrecked off the coast. After swimming to safety, they spotted it as it was washed ashore after being dumped into the sea by Muslim pirates. In 1648 when Father Ferreira was posted to Colvá, he placed the statue on the altar, and it soon started drawing large crowds of devotees as it granted their favours. The  statue is kept for public viewing in October for the annual  ('Fame') festival for which thousands of people assemble. This is the only time that it is removed from the triple-vault locks of the church. It is then dipped into a nearby river after a procession, and the pilgrims use this water for anointment and good luck.

Demographics and geography

Location
Colvá recognises three beaches; firstly the main Colvá beach which is the prime beach, secondly Sunset beach (towards Betalbatim) which is less congested, and thirdly Baywatch beach (towards Benaulim at Sernabatim). The closest railway station is in Margao followed by Vasco da Gama, Goa. The airport is Dabolim Airport (GOI) at Vasco da Gama, Goa. The neighbouring villages are Betalbatim and Benaulim and the nearest city Margao.

Distances around Goa (from Colva):
Margao - ,
Vasco - ,
Mapusa - ,
Calangute - ,
Ponda - ,
Dabolim Airport - ,
Panjim - ,
Tiracol - .

Climate
Colvá features a tropical monsoon climate under the Köppen climate classification. Colvá, being in the tropical zone and near the Arabian Sea, has a hot and humid climate for most of the year. The month of May is the hottest, seeing day temperatures of over  coupled with high humidity. The monsoon rains arrive by early June and provide a much-needed respite from the heat. Most of Colvá's annual rainfall is received through the monsoons which last till late September.

Colvá has a short winter season between mid-December and February.

Language
The Saxtti dialect of Konkani, belonging to the Indo-European family of languages, is the local language and spoken widely by the people of Colvá. Konkani is primarily written in the Latin script in Colvá. Portuguese is spoken by the elite and older generations including the ones with Portuguese ancestry. English is spoken by all and is compulsorily taught in schools. Marathi and Hindi are also widely understood and spoken throughout the locality.

Colva Beach 

Colva beach stretches for around 2.4 km, part of a beach consisting of about 25 km of powder white sand, lined along its shore by coconut palms, and extending as far as Bogmalo Beach to the north and Cabo de rama Beach to the South Goa's coastline. Colva is now a famous tourist destination, enjoyed for its beach. The tourist industry is well developed with many budget hotels, guest houses, beach shacks, food stalls, small restaurants and pubs and bars, although these developments have not extended in any large degree to the nightlife. The beaches are constantly monitored by lifeguards and the swimming areas flagged with coloured flags accordingly. Being one of the famous beaches of Goa, this beach is highly crowded most of the time of the year. With a majority of its visitors being domestic Indian visitors this beach is mostly neglected by foreigners.

Travel
The nearest airport is Dabolim Airport which is about 21 km away. The nearest railway station is Madgoan junction railway station, 20 minutes' drive away. Colva beach can be reached from Margao by bus. Private transport is also available.

Culture

Religion
Colvá is predominantly Roman Catholic and has Hindus as well as Muslims. The recently constructed Mangueshi temple is the presence of a growing Hindu population in Colvá. The main village church has various masses and novenas at various times of the year. The traditional feast called  is celebrated on the 2nd Monday of October every year, and pilgrims from around the world take part.

Food and beverages
Colvakars, or people from Colvá, love fish and seafood. The cuisine is influenced by Hindu God Saraswat Brahmin origins and four hundred years of Portuguese governance and recently a blend of modern techniques. The locals enjoy rice with fish curry ( in Konkani), which is the staple diet in Goa. Colvá cuisine is famous for its rich variety of fish dishes cooked with elaborate recipes. Coconut and coconut oil are widely used in cooking along with chili peppers, spices and vinegar, giving the food a unique flavour. Various seafood delicacies include kingfish (the most common delicacy), pomfret, shark, tuna and mackerel. Among the shellfish are crabs, prawns, tiger prawns, lobster, squid and mussels. Colvá food has pork dishes such as vindaloo, chouriço and sorpotel. Beef dishes and chicken xacuti are cooked for major occasions amongst the Catholics. Sannas are relished. A rich egg-based, multi-layered sweet dish known as bebinca is a favourite at Christmas. , beef croquettes, fried mussels and semolina prawns are favourite starters.

The most popular alcoholic beverage in Goa and enjoyed in Colvá is feni. Cashew feni is made from the fermentation of the fruit of the cashew tree, while coconut feni is made from the sap of toddy palms. The people also drink wine, especially on feast days.

See also
 Diogo Rodrigues

References

External links 

 "GoaCentral.Com - Colva Beach"
 "Colva Fama" at GoaTourism.gov.in
 Colva Photographs, 2012

Villages in South Goa district
Comunidades of Goa
Beaches of South Goa district
Beaches of Goa